Prelap is a screenwriting term that means the dialogue from the next scene precedes the cut, and the beginning of the dialogue is heard in the outgoing scene. As an example:

 ADRIAN (V.O., PRELAP)
 Peter?  Peter, where are you?
 
 EXT. THE WOODS – DAY
 
 Adrian is out looking for Peter.  
 We see him wander around in the small forest.
 
 ADRIAN
 Peter?  Hello?  Are you there?

In this example, Adrian's voice precedes the scene out in the woods. The "V.O." means "Voice Over" and the "PRELAP" indicates that Adrian's dialogue should be heard before the next scene begins. Adrian, in this example, might not even be in the scene the other characters are in when the prelap occurs. ("O.S." or "Off Screen" would not be appropriate as the term should only be used for characters unseen but on set.)

Prelaps can be of sound or dialogue, or anything non-visual, since a visual would indicate a direct cut to a new scene.

Film and video terminology